Mohammad Mehdi Elhaei (born July 17, 1992 in Ahvaz) is an Iranian football player that currently plays in Sanat Naft in the Iran Pro League. He is an Iranian Arab.

Club career
He played his first match for Persepolis in 2008–09 season.

Club career statistics

 Assist Goals

Honours
Hazfi Cup
Winner: 2
2009/10 with Persepolis
2010/11 with Persepolis

References 

Iranian footballers
Living people
Persepolis F.C. players
Sanat Naft Abadan F.C. players
1992 births
Association football midfielders
Iranian Arab sportspeople
People from Ahvaz
Sportspeople from Khuzestan province